Asbjørn Helgeland (born 4 February 1966) is a Norwegian football coach and former player.

He started his career in Djerv 1919; and later played for Vålerenga and Fyllingen. He joined the newly founded club FK Haugesund ahead of the 1994 season, and became a stalwart in the team. He left FK Haugesund in 1998, went on trial in China but played for Örebro SK in 1999. He returned to FK Haugesund in the summer of 2000 as playing assistant coach, but left the club after the 2000 season. He continued as assistant coach under Kjell-Inge Bråtveit, who was fired after the 2002 season.

Helgeland continued his playing career in Djerv 1919. In 2007, he reached the milestone of scoring 200 goals for the team. He was still active as of autumn 2008.

In December 2008 Helgeland was hired as managing director in FK Haugesund. He had formerly, in late 2006, rejected a job offer as player developer.

References

Norwegian footballers
SK Djerv 1919 players
Vålerenga Fotball players
Eliteserien players
Allsvenskan players
Fyllingen Fotball players
FK Haugesund players
Örebro SK players
Expatriate footballers in Sweden
Norwegian expatriate sportspeople in Sweden
Norwegian expatriate footballers
People from Haugesund
1966 births
Living people
Association football midfielders
FK Haugesund non-playing staff
Sportspeople from Rogaland